René Pitter (born 8 July 1989) is an Austrian former professional association football player who spent his entire playing career at Kapfenberger SV. He played as a defender and decided to retire at the age of 23 after undergoing hyaline cartilage. He currently works as the manager of Kapfenberger youth team.

References

1989 births
Living people
Austrian footballers
Association football defenders
Kapfenberger SV players
People from Bruck an der Mur
Footballers from Styria